A snowmobile, also known as a Ski-Doo, snowmachine, sled,  motor sled, motor sledge, skimobile, or snow scooter, is a motorized vehicle designed for winter travel and recreation on snow. It is designed to be operated on snow and ice and does not require a road or trail, but most are driven on open terrain or trails. Snowmobiling is a sport that many people have taken on as a serious hobby.

Older snowmobiles could generally accommodate two people; however, most snowmobiles manufactured since the 1990s have been designed to only accommodate one person. Snowmobiles built with the ability to accommodate two people are referred to as "2-up" snowmobiles or "touring" models and make up an extremely small share of the market. Most snowmobiles do not have any enclosures, except for a windshield, and their engines normally drive a continuous track at the rear. Skis at the front provide directional control.

Early snowmobiles used simple rubber tracks, but modern snowmobiles' tracks are usually made of a Kevlar composite construction. The earliest snowmobiles were powered by readily available industrial four-stroke, air-cooled engines. These would quickly be replaced by lighter and more powerful two-stroke gasoline internal combustion engines and since the mid-2000s four-stroke engines had re-entered the market.

The second half of the 20th century saw the rise of recreational snowmobiling, whose riders are called snowmobilers, sledders, or slednecks. Recreational riding is known as snowcross/racing, trail riding, freestyle, boondocking, ditchbanging and grass drags. In the summertime snowmobilers can drag race on grass, asphalt strips, or even across water (as in snowmobile skipping).  Snowmobiles are sometimes modified to compete in long-distance off-road races.

Legality 
Depending on jurisdiction, there may be penalties for driving outside permitted areas, without an approved helmet, without a driver's license, with an unregistered snowmobile, or while under the influence of alcohol or other substances. There may also be regulations regarding noise and wildlife.

Driver's license 
In some jurisdictions, a driver's license is required to operate a snowmobile. A specific snowmobile driver's license is required in, for example, Norway and Sweden. In Finland, a snowmobile driver's license is not required if the driver already has another type of appropriate driver's license (for example car or tractor).

Early history 

In 1911 a 24-year-old, Harold J. Kalenze (pronounced Collins), patented the Vehicle Propeller in Brandon, Manitoba, Canada.

In 1915 Ray H. Muscott of Waters, Michigan, received the Canadian patent for his motor sleigh, or "traineau automobile", and on June 27, 1916, he received the first United States patent for a snow-vehicle using the now recognized format of rear track(s) and front skis. Many individuals later modified Ford Model Ts with the undercarriage replaced by tracks and skis following this design. They were popular for rural mail delivery for a time. The common name for these conversion of cars and small trucks was Snowflyers.

Ossipee, New Hampshire claims to be the home of the first snowmobile. In 1917, Virgil D. White set up to create a patent for his conversion kit that changed the Ford Model T into a "snowmobile". He also copyrighted the term "snowmobile". At the time, the conversion kit was expensive, costing about $395. Virgil White applied his patent in 1918 and created his own snowmobile. In 1922, his conversion kit was on the markets and available only through Ford dealerships.

In 1935 Joseph Bombardier assembled and successfully tested the first snowmobile. It was a vehicle with a sprocket wheel and a track drive system, and it was steered by skis. 

The challenges of cross-country transportation in the winter led to the invention of the snowmobile, an all-terrain vehicle specifically designed for travel across deep snow where other vehicles foundered. During the 20th century, rapidly evolving designs produced machines that were two-person tracked vehicles powered by gas engines that enabled them to tow a sled or travel, initially at low-to-moderate speeds, depending on snow conditions, terrain and obstacles protruding above the snow like brush and trees.

Multi-passenger snowmobiles 

The origin of the snowmobile is not the work of any one inventor but more a process of advances in engines for the propulsion of vehicles and supporting devices over snow. It parallels the development of the automobile and later aviation, often inventors using the same components for a different use.

Wisconsinites experimented with over-snow vehicles before 1900, experimenting with bicycles equipped with runners and gripping fins; steam-propelled sleighs; and (later) Model T Fords converted with rear tractor treads and skis in front. A patent (554.482) for the Sled-Propeller design, without a model, was submitted on Sept. 5, 1895 by inventors William J. Culman and William B. Follis of Brule, Wisconsin. In the first races held near Three Lakes in 1926, 104 of these "snowbuggies" started. Carl Eliason of Sayner developed the prototype of the modern snowmobile in the 1920s when he mounted a two-cylinder motorcycle engine on a long sled, steered it with skis under the front, and propelled it with single, endless track. Eliason made 40 snowmobiles, patented in 1927. Upon receiving an order for 200 from Finland, he sold his patent to the FWD Company of Clintonville. They made 300 for military use, then transferred the patent to a Canadian subsidiary.

The American Motor Sleigh was a short-lived novelty vehicle produced in Boston in 1905. Designed for travel on snow, it consisted of a sleigh body mounted on a framework that held an engine, a drive-shaft system, and runners. Although considered an interesting novelty, sales were low and production ceased in 1906.

The Aerosani, propeller-driven and running on skis, was built in 1909–1910 by Russian inventor Igor Sikorsky of helicopter fame. Aerosanis were used by the Soviet Red Army during the Winter War and World War II. There is some dispute over whether Aerosanis count as snowmobiles because they were not propelled by tracks.

Adolphe Kégresse designed an original caterpillar tracks system, called the Kégresse track, while working for Tsar Nicholas II of Russia between 1906 and 1916. These used a flexible belt rather than interlocking metal segments and could be fitted to a conventional car or truck to turn it into a half-track, suitable for use over soft ground, including snow. Conventional front wheels and steering were used but the wheel could be fitted with skis as seen in the upper right image. He applied it to several cars in the Royal garage including Rolls-Royce cars and Packard trucks. Although this was not a snowmobile, it is an ancestor of the modern concept.

The relatively dry snow conditions of the United States Midwest suited the converted Ford Model Ts and other like vehicles, but they were not suitable for humid snow areas such as southern Quebec and New England. This led Joseph-Armand Bombardier from the small town of Valcourt, Quebec, to invent a different caterpillar track system suitable for all kinds of snow conditions. Bombardier had already made some "metal" tracked vehicles since 1928, but his new revolutionary track traction system (a toothed wheel covered in rubber, and a rubber-and-cotton track that wraps around the back wheels) was his first major invention. He started production of the B-7, an enclosed, seven-passenger snowmobile, in 1937, and introduced the B-12, a twelve-passenger model, in 1942. The B-7 had a V-8 flathead engine from Ford Motor Company. The B-12 had a flathead in line six-cylinder engine from Chrysler industrial, and 2,817 units were produced until 1951. It was used in many applications, such as ambulances, Canada Post vehicles, winter "school buses", forestry machines, and even army vehicles in World War II. Bombardier had always dreamed of a smaller version, more like the size of a motor scooter.

Brands

Early models
Numerous people had ideas for a smaller personal snowmobile. In 1914, O. M. Erickson and Art Olsen of the P.N. Bushnell company in Aberdeen, South Dakota, built an open two-seater "motor-bob" out of an Indian motorcycle modified with a cowl-cover, side-by-side seating, and a set of sled-runners fore and aft. While it did not have the tracks of a true snowmobile, its appearance was otherwise similar to the modern version and is one of the earliest examples of a personal motorized snow-vehicle.

In 1951 Dr. Fritz Riemerschmid devised what he called a snow scooter. The machine had a track mounted beneath a snowboard like base, on top of which were an enclosed engine with motorcycle like seat and fuel tank. the vehicle was steered via a steering wheel and cables linked to two small skis on outriggers either side of the vehicle.

In the mid-1950s, a United States firm built a "snowmobile the arctic area of Alaska that had the drive train reversed of today's snowmobiles with two front wheels—the larger one behind the smaller one—with tires driving an endless loop track". Little is known about this "snowmobile" meant to haul cargo and trade goods to isolated settlements.

An odd version of snowmobile is the Swedish Larven, made by the Lenko Company of Östersund, from the 1960s until the end of the 1980s. It was a very small and basic design, with just an engine in the rear and a track. The driver sat on it and steered using skis on his feet.

Polaris
Edgar and Allen Hetteen and David Johnson of Roseau, Minnesota, invented what we now know as the modern snowmobile in 1955–1956, but the early machines were heavy and slow. Their company, Hetteen Hoist & Derrick Co., became Polaris Industries which introduced their first commercial model, the Polaris Sno Traveler in 1957.

BRP
In 1960, Joseph-Armand Bombardier introduced his own snowmobile using an open-cockpit one- or two-person form, similar to the 1957 Polaris Sno Traveler, and started selling it under the brand name Ski-Doo through his company Bombardier Inc. (now manufactured by Bombardier Recreational Products).

Competitors copied and improved his design; in the 1970s there were over a hundred snowmobile manufacturers. From 1970 to 1973, two million machines were sold, peaking at 500,000 sold in 1971. Many of the snowmobile companies were small and the biggest manufacturers were often attempts by motorcycle makers and outboard motor makers to branch off in a new market. Most of these companies went bankrupt or were acquired by larger companies during the 1973 oil crisis and succeeding recessions. Sales rebounded to 260,000 in 1997 but gradually decreased afterward, influenced by warmer winters and the use during all four seasons of small one- or two-person ATVs.

Alpina
Alpina Snowmobiles are manufactured in Vicenza, Italy, by Alpina s.r.l., a manufacturer of various on-snow implements that had been building dual-track snowmobiles since 1995.

There are two manufacturers of dual-track snowmobiles. One is Alpina and the other is a Russian sled called Buran (Bombardier discontinued manufacturing its dual-track model, the Elite, in 2005).

Models
Alpina manufactures one basic dual-track snowmobile design. In 2002 the Sherpa was introduced and is the model name for the four-stroke machine. Prior to introducing the Sherpa, Alpina offered a two-stroke series designated the Superclass. The four-stroke Sherpa is currently the top machine in production. A new version of the Superclass has been released in 2017, with a lot of innovations and a new four-stroke engine.

The Sherpa and Superclass series shared the same basic dual-track platform, twin  tracks with dual skis up front.

Power for the Sherpa is supplied by a 1.6L in-line four-cylinder gasoline automotive engine. The new Superclass power is provided by a 1.2L 3-cylinder four-stroke gasoline engine.

Features
The Sherpa and Superclass are designed as working snowmobiles for carrying supplies, pulling cargo sleds, pulling trail grooming implements, carrying several passengers, and negotiating deep snow.

Engine and transmission combination are designed to deliver optimum power to pull or carry large loads while top-end speeds are kept below , depending on the model. The large footprint of the dual tracks and dual skis allows the Sherpa and Superclass to "float" on top of deep snow and not sink in and get stuck.

Taiga Electric
Taiga Motors in Montreal created the first commercially produced electric snowmobile. At , the Taiga TS2 is one of the lightest in the industry. Maintains a range of  even down past . Direct drive, no transmission. Integrated GPS for easy course mapping & accurate range estimation. DC quick charge (20 min) option. Different options are available for utility, touring, crossover and mountain machines.

Current markets

, the snowmobile market has been shared between the four large North American makers (Bombardier Recreational Products (BRP), Arctic Cat, Yamaha, and Polaris) and some specialized makers like the Quebec-based AD Boivin, manufacturer of the Snow Hawk and the European Alpina snowmobile.

Snowmobiles are widely used in arctic territories for travel. However, the small Arctic population means a correspondingly small market. Most snowmobiles are sold for recreational purposes, in places where snow cover is stable during winter. The number of snowmobiles in Europe and other parts of the world is low.

Snowmobiles designed to perform various work tasks have been available for many years with dual tracks from such manufacturers as Aktiv (Sweden), who made the Grizzly, Ockelbo (Sweden), who made the 8000, and Bombardier who made the Alpine and later the Alpine II. Currently there are two manufacturers of dual-track snowmobiles; Russia's Buran and the Italian Alpina snowmobiles (under the name Sherpa and Superclass).

Propulsion
Most modern snowmobiles are powered by either a four- or two-stroke internal combustion engine, with the exception of the Taiga TS2.  Historically, snowmobiles have always used two-stroke engines because of their reduced complexity, weight and cost, compared to a similarly powered four-stroke. However, four-stroke powered snowmobiles have been gaining popularity steadily in the last fifteen or so years, with manufacturer Yamaha producing four-stroke snowmobiles only. The Whistler Blackcomb ski resort is testing Taiga's electric snowmobiles with lower noise, and similar vehicles exist.

Performance
The first snowmobiles made do with as little as  engines, but engine sizes and efficiency have improved drastically. Recently, some models are turbo-charged, resulting in dramatic increase of engine horsepower. Snowmobiles are capable of moving across steep hillsides without sliding down-slope if the rider transfers their weight towards the uphill side, a process called side-hilling.

Mountain sleds permit access in remote areas with deep snow, which was nearly impossible a few decades ago. This is mainly due to alterations, enhancements, and additions of original trail model designs such as weight, weight distribution, track length, paddle depth, and power. Technology and design advances in mountain snowmobiles have improved since 2003 with Ski-Doo's introduction of the "REV" framework platform. These may not be as popular as many 800 cc models outperform them because of weight and an increase of unneeded power.

Cornices and other kinds of jumps are sought after for aerial maneuvers. Riders often search for non-tracked, virgin terrain and are known to "trailblaze" or "boondock" deep into remote territory where there is absolutely no visible path to follow. However, this type of trailblazing is dangerous as contact with buried rocks, logs, and frozen ground can cause extensive damage and injuries. Riders look for large open fields of fresh snow where they can carve. Some riders use extensively modified snowmobiles, customized with aftermarket accessories like handle-bar risers, handguards, custom/lightweight hoods, windshields, and seats, running board supports, studs, and numerous other modifications that increase power and maneuverability. Many of these customizations can now be purchased straight off the showroom floor on stock models.

Trail snowmobiles improved in the past 15 years as well (many of them borrowed from endeavors to produce winning mountain sleds). Heavy "muscle sleds" can produce speeds in excess of  due to powerful engines (up to 1,200 cc stock, and custom engines exceeding 1,200 cc), short tracks, and good traction on groomed trails. Sno-cross oriented snowmobiles often have an engine size cap of 440 or 600 cc, but lighter machines with redesigned stances, formats, and weight control have produced extremely fast and quickly accelerating race sleds.

Environmental impact
The environmental impact of snowmobiles has been the subject of much debate. Governments have been reacting slowly to noise and air pollution, partly because of lobbying from manufacturers and snowmobilers. For instance, in 1999, the Canadian government adopted the Canadian Environmental Protection Act, 1999, but the set of rules governing pollution emissions for off-road vehicles was only released in January 2005.  In another example of regulation, only four-stroke snowmobiles are allowed in Yellowstone National Park since a bylaw was recently passed to minimize CO2 emissions and noise. In Yellowstone, snowmobiles account for 80% of total hydrocarbon emissions and 50% of carbon monoxide emissions in the winter. This is just less than 2% and 1% respectively of the overall annual pollution within the park. Snowmobiles are only allowed to be ridden on the unplowed roads used in the summer, and riding off the roads is prohibited. This accounts for less than 1% (0.002%) of the park area.

In 2005 the US Forest Service published a Travel Management Rule for off-highway vehicles, strengthening the implementation of Executive Orders issued in the 1970s. However, these rules were not applied to snowmobiles. In 2015, following a decision in a lawsuit brought by Winter Wildlands Alliance against the Forest Service, the rules were extended to snowmobiles. National Forests with sufficient snow for winter recreation are now required to designate where OSVs are allowed to travel and where they are prohibited. In doing so, the Forest Service must minimize 1) damage to soil, watershed, vegetation, and other forest resources; 2) harassment of wildlife and significant disruption of wildlife habitats; and 3) conflicts between motor vehicle use and existing or proposed recreational uses of National Forest System lands or neighboring Federal lands.

Air 

Most snowmobiles are still powered by two-stroke engines, although Alpina and Yamaha have been using four-strokes since 2002 and 2003, respectively. However, in the last decade several manufacturers have been successful in designing less polluting motors, and putting most of them in production. Yamaha and Arctic-Cat were the first to mass-produce four-stroke models, which are significantly less polluting than the early two-stroke machines. Alpina offers only four-stroke EFI engines equipped with a catalytic converter and dual oxygen-probe. Bombardier's E-Tec two-stroke motors emit 85% less pollutants than previous carbureted two-strokes. Polaris has developed a fuel-injection technology called "Cleanfire Injection" on their two-strokes. The industry is also working on a direct-injected "clean two strokes" that is better in terms of NOX emissions.

Independent researchers, undergraduates and graduate students participate in contests to lessen the impact of emissions from snowmobiles. The Clean Snow Mobile Challenge is held yearly at Michigan Technological University regrouping the entries from universities from across United States and Canada. Some of the participants in recent years have been the École polytechnique de Montréal with a Quasiturbine engine and students from École de technologie supérieure of the UQAM with a less polluting two-stroke engine using E85 and direct injection.

Noise 
Maximum noise restrictions have been enacted by law for both production of snowmobiles and aftermarket components. For instance, in Quebec (Canada) noise levels must be 78 decibels or less at 20 meters from a snowmobile path. As of 2009, snowmobiles produce 90% less noise than in the 1960s but there are still numerous complaints. Efforts to reduce noise focus on suppressing mechanical noise of the suspension components and tracks.  Arctic Cat in 2005 introduced "Silent Track technology" on touring models such as the T660 Turbo, Bearcat, and some M-Series sleds. Ski-Doo has since then also used comparative "silent track technology" on some models.

The use of aftermarket exhaust systems ("cans" or "silencers") is controversial. These replace the stock muffler with a less restrictive system that is usually claimed to increase power output of the engine. However, these aftermarket exhausts are often much louder than those from the factory, with only some being slightly quieter than a completely open, unbaffled system. Most, if not all, local snowmobile clubs (that maintain and groom trail systems) do not recommend them because of noise. Local and state authorities have set up checkpoints on high-traffic trails, checking for excessively loud systems and issuing citations. Typically these systems are installed on two-stroke powered machines (giving the distinctive "braap" sound); however, in recent years aftermarket companies have released silencers for four-stroke models as well.

Importance in isolated communities
Since the invention of snowmobiles, isolated communities of northern North America have always had a demand for them. However, the early snowmobiles designs were not economical or functional enough for the harsh environment of northern North America. Joseph-Armand Bombardier started producing the Ski-Doo in 1959 at the request of a priest. The priest had asked Bombardier to make an economical and reliable means of winter travel. The Ski-Doo greatly changed life in northern North America's isolated communities, where Ski-Doo replaced sled dogs by the end of the 1960s. The Ski-Doo also greatly improved communication between isolated communities. Snowmobiles are also called "Snow Machines” in some areas of Alaska.

Work
In northern North America, historically, isolated communities depended on dog sledding and snowshoeing as their primary method of transportation for hunting during the winter months. The Ski-Doo allowed trappers to travel greater distances faster, allowing them to expand their hunting grounds. Prospectors, mining companies, foresters, backcountry cabin owners, the Royal Canadian Mounted Police and Canadian Army also found snowmobiles very effective because they were the most economical method of transportation of small loads.

Recreation

Joseph-Armand Bombardier's tests of Ski-Dog proved that snowmobiling was fun, and snowmobiling became a new form of outdoor recreation. People who once sat dormant throughout winter were now given the opportunity in more outdoor activities.

Economic impact

According to the International Snowmobile Manufacturers Association, snowmobilers in Canada and the United States spend over $28 billion on snowmobiling each year. This includes expenditures on equipment, clothing, accessories, snowmobiling vacations (lodging, fuel, and food), maintenance and others. Often this is the only source of income for some smaller towns, such as Bralorne, British Columbia, that rely solely on tourism during the summer and winter months. Once a booming gold mining town, Bralorne is now a very small town with a population of 60, and it is relatively inaccessible by car in the winter. The economy relies on visits from snowmobilers, who contribute to the economy by spending money on gas, food, and hotels.

Accidents and safety
As a result of their inherent maneuverability, acceleration, and high-speed abilities, skill and physical strength are both required to operate a snowmobile.

Snowmobile injuries and fatalities are high compared to those caused by on road motor vehicle traffic. Losing control of a snowmobile could easily cause extensive damage, injury, or death. One such cause of snowmobile accidents is loss of control from a loose grip. If the rider falls off, the loss of control can easily result in the snowmobile colliding with a nearby object, such as a rock or tree. Most snowmobiles are fitted with a cord connected to a kill switch, which would stop the snowmobile if the rider falls off; however, not all riders use this device every time they operate a snowmobile.

Swerving off of the path may result in rolling the snowmobile or crashing into an obstacle. In unfamiliar areas, riders may crash into suspended barbed wire or haywire fences at high speeds. Each year a number of serious or fatal accidents are caused by these factors.

Each year, riders are killed by hitting other snowmobiles, automobiles, pedestrians, rocks, trees, or fences, or falling through thin ice. On average, 10 people a year have died in such crashes in Minnesota alone, with alcohol a contributing factor in many cases. In Saskatchewan, 16 out of 21 deaths in snowmobile collisions between 1996 and 2000 were caused by the effects of alcohol. Wrestler Lindsey Durlacher died in 2011 following surgery for a broken sternum he sustained in a snowmobile accident.

Fatal collisions with trains can also occur when a snowmobile operator engages in the illegal practice of "rail riding", riding between railroad track rails over snow-covered sleepers. Inability to hear the sound of an oncoming train over the engine noise of a snowmobile makes this activity extremely dangerous. Collision with large animals such as moose and deer, which may venture onto a snowmobile trail, is another major cause of snowmobile accidents. Most often such encounters occur at night or in low-visibility conditions when the animal could not be seen in time to prevent a collision. Also even when successful, a sudden maneuver to miss hitting the animal could still result in the operator losing control of the snowmobile.

A large number of snowmobile deaths in Alaska are caused by drowning. Because of the cold weather in many parts of Alaska, the rivers and lakes are generally frozen over during certain times of the year in winter. People who ride early or late in the season run the risk of falling through weak ice, and heavy winter clothing can make it extremely difficult to escape the cold water. While a snowmobile is heavy, it also distributes its weight at a larger area than a standing person, so a driver who has stopped his vehicle out on the ice of a frozen lake can go through the ice just by stepping off the snowmobile.

The next leading cause of injury and death is avalanches, which can result from the practice of highmarking, or driving a snowmobile as far up a hill as it can go. During the 2018–2019 season, 7 snowmobilers in the United States were killed. Avalanche safety education is critical for those accessing the backcountry.

Risks can be reduced through education, proper training, appropriate gear, attention to published avalanche warnings and avoiding drinking alcohol. In some areas of Western U.S., organizations provide avalanche training, some of which is free. It is recommended that snowmobile riders wear a helmet and a snowmobile suit.

Types of races

 The International 500 is a large racing event held annually in Sault Sainte Marie, Michigan. It is a  race on a track, with the current purse being in excess of $40,000. It has been running since February 1969.
 Drag racing is common with snowmobiles year-round, with summer and fall often with grass or closed-course (asphalt or concrete) drag strips. The largest event is Hay Days in North Branch, Minnesota, on the first weekend following Labor Day.
 The World Championship Watercross or snowmobile skipping races are held in Grantsburg, Wisconsin, in July. The snowmobiles are raced on a marked course, similar to motocross courses, without the ramps and on water.
 The Snocross racing series are snowmobile races on a motocross-like course. The races are held during the winter season in Northern United States and Canada. One of the largest in New York is the Northeast SnoX Challenge in early January in Malone, New York, and run by Rock Maple Racing and sponsored by the Malone Chamber of Commerce.
 Snowmobiles are used for ice racing. The racing is held on an "Ice Oval" track. The World Championship Snowmobile Derby is held each winter in Eagle River, Wisconsin.
 Alaska's "Iron Dog" is the longest snowmachine race in the world. The name refers to dog mushing, long popular in Alaska.
 Vintage Snowmobile Racing is the racing of vintage snowmobiles and has grown in popularity as a sporting event on the Canadian prairie and in America.
 The World Championship Hill Climb competition is held in Jackson, Wyoming, at the Snow King Mountain resort each year in March. 2019 was the 43rd year of the four-day event and drew around 10,000 in attendance.

Snow bike
 

A snow bike takes a typical dirt bike and replaces the rear wheel with a single tread system similar to a snowmobile and the front wheel with a large ski. It is much smaller and nimbler than a snowmobile, and it has a tighter turning radius, which lets the rider go where many snowmobiles cannot. The first prototype of motorcycles with a rear tread date to the 1920s, with subsequent failed attempts to bring them to market. Many motorcycles made after the 1990s can be fitted with kits that transform them into snow bikes. In 2017, Winter X-Games introduced the first snow bike event in the form of a SnowBikeCross race. The following year they introduced a Best Trick event.

See also
 List of Canadian inventions and discoveries
 Hyanide
 Hydrocopter
 Non-road engine
 Snow coach
 ZIL-2906

Notes

References
 Descarries, Eric.  "Autoneiges Bombardier: Des patenteux perpétuent la tradition". in La Presse. Monday, March 13, 2006.
 MacDonald, Larry.  The Bombardier story: planes, trains, and snowmobiles. Toronto: J. Wiley, 2001.
 SLEDtv.org – Snowmobile Television – Snowmobile Statistics
 CBC Digital Archives – Bombardier: The Snowmobile Legacy
 Carl Eliason's snowmobile story and his Patent

External links

 How Stuff Works – Snowmobiles
 Environmental Impact Studies
 The International Association of Snowmobile Manufacturers

Snowmobiles
Tracked vehicles
Racing vehicles
Sliding vehicles
Inuit transport
Canadian inventions
Articles containing video clips